Marcel Lessard,  (born August 14, 1926) is a Canadian former politician.

Lessard was first elected to the House of Commons of Canada as the Social Credit Member of Parliament (MP) for Lac-Saint-Jean, Quebec as part of Réal Caouette's breakthrough in the province in the 1962 election. He was re-elected in the 1963 election.

The Social Credit Party split soon after along English and French lines, however Lessard declined to join the majority of Social Credit's Quebec MPs who followed Caouette into the Ralliement Créditiste and remained with the Alberta-based Social Credit Party led by Robert Thompson for the rest of the parliamentary term.

During the 1964 Great Flag Debate, Lessard was a member of the parliamentary committee that recommended the adoption of the Maple Leaf flag.

In the 1965 federal election, he ran as an independent candidate, and was defeated by the Ralliement Créditiste candidate.

He returned to the House in the 1968 election as a Liberal. In 1970, Lessard became parliamentary secretary to the Minister of Agriculture. In 1975, he was appointed to the Cabinet as Minister of Regional Economic Expansion. He remained in that position until the 1979 election that defeated the Liberal government. Lessard retained his seat, and joined the Liberals on the Opposition benches. He retired from politics at the 1980 federal election.

References

External links
 

1926 births
Living people
Liberal Party of Canada MPs
Members of the House of Commons of Canada from Quebec
Members of the King's Privy Council for Canada
Social Credit Party of Canada MPs